The 2012 Soul Train Music Awards were held at Planet Hollywood in Las Vegas, Nevada on November 25, 2012. The show was hosted by actor/comedian Cedric the Entertainer. Performers included New Edition, Miguel, Ne-Yo, Keyshia Cole, Tyrese, Elle Varner, John Legend, 2 Chainz, Stevie Wonder, Eddie Levert, Charlie Wilson, Fantasia, Anthony Hamilton, and Marcus Canty. The evening also featured a tribute to the late Soul Train creator Don Cornelius.

Special awards

Lifetime Achievement Award
 New Edition

Winners and nominees
Winners are in bold text.

Album of the Year
 Frank Ocean – Channel Orange
 Eric Benét – The One
 R. Kelly – Write Me Back
 Nas – Life is Good
 Usher – Looking 4 Myself

Song of the Year
 Tyrese – "Stay"
 Estelle – "Thank You"
 John Legend  – "Tonight (Best You Ever Had)"
 Trey Songz – "Heart Attack"
 Usher – "Climax"
 Wale  – "Lotus Flower Bomb"

The Ashford & Simpson Songwriter's Award
 John Legend  – "Tonight (Best You Ever Had)"
 Written by: Allen Arthur, Christopher Bridges, Keith Justice, Miguel Pimentel, Clayton Reilly and John Stephens
 Estelle – "Thank You"
 Written by: Arden Altino, Akene Dunkley, Jerry Duplessis, Doug F. Edwards, Thomas D. Richardson and Aliaune Thiam
 R. Kelly – "Share My Love"
 Written by: Robert Kelly
 Nas – "Daughters"
 Written by: Nasir Jones, Ernest D. Wilson, Patrick Adams, Gary DeCarlo, Dale Frashuer and Paul Leka
 Usher – "Climax"
 Written by: Usher Raymond IV, Sean Fenton, Thomas Pentz and Ariel Rechtshaid

Best R&B/Soul Male Artist
 Miguel
 Trey Songz
 Robin Thicke
 Tyrese
 Usher

Best R&B/Soul Female Artist
 Beyoncé
 Mary J. Blige
 Keyshia Cole
 Estelle
 Fantasia
 Rihanna
 Elle Varner

Best New Artist
 Elle Varner
 Robert Glasper
 J. Cole
 Luke James
 Emeli Sandé

Centric Award
 Leah LaBelle
 Gary Clark, Jr.
 Daley
 Santigold
 Esperanza Spalding
Rihanna

Best Hip-Hop Song of the Year
 Kanye West  – "Mercy"
 2 Chainz  – "No Lie"
 Nas – "Daughters"
 Wale  – "Lotus Flower Bomb"
 Young Jeezy  – "Leave You Alone"

Best Dance Performance
 Beyoncé – "Love on Top"
 Chris Brown – "Turn Up the Music"
 Nicki Minaj – "Starships"
 Rihanna – "Where Have You Been"
 Usher – "Scream"

CENTRICTV.com Awards

Best Caribbean Performance
 Sean Paul – Tomahawk Technique
 Jimmy Cliff – Rebirth
 Cover Drive – Bajan Style
 Damian Marley – SuperHeavy
 Matisyahu – Spark Seeker
Rihanna - Where Have You Been

Best International Performance
 Estelle – "Thank You"
 Daley  – "Alone Together"
 Rebecca Ferguson – "Nothing's Real but Love"
 Gotye  – "Somebody That I Used to Know"
 Emeli Sandé – "Next to Me"
 Amy Winehouse – "Our Day Will Come"
Rihanna - Where Have You Been

Best Traditional Jazz Artist/Group
 Tony Bennett – Isn't It Romantic? (tie)
 Robert Glasper – Black Radio (tie)
 Chris Botti – Impressions
 Melody Gardot – The Absence
 Kenny Garrett – Seeds from the Underground

Best Contemporary Jazz Artist/Group
 Esperanza Spalding – Radio Music Society
 Brian Culbertson – Dreams
 Ben Tankard – Full Tank
 Peter White – Here We Go
 Cassandra Wilson – Another Country

Performers
 New Edition
 Miguel
 Keyshia Cole
 John Legend
 Tyrese
 Ne-Yo 
 2 Chainz
 Stevie Wonder
 Elle Varner
 Eddie Levert
 Charlie Wilson
 Fantasia
 Marcus Canty
 Anthony Hamilton

Telecast
The Soul Train Awards were taped on November 8 and aired on BET and Centric on November 25, 2012.

References

External links
 BET Official website

2012 Soul Train Music Awards
Zappos Theater
Soul
Soul
Soul
Soul